Oleksii Denysiuk is a Ukrainian paralympic sport shooter. He competed in the Shooting at the 2016 Summer Paralympics, winning the bronze medal in the mixed 50m pistol event. Denysiuk also competed at the 2020 Summer Paralympics, winning the bronze medal in the mixed 25m pistol event.

References

External links 
Paralympic Games profile

Living people
Place of birth missing (living people)
Year of birth missing (living people)
Ukrainian male sport shooters
Shooters at the 2016 Summer Paralympics
Shooters at the 2020 Summer Paralympics
Medalists at the 2016 Summer Paralympics
Medalists at the 2020 Summer Paralympics
Paralympic medalists in shooting
Paralympic shooters of Ukraine
Paralympic bronze medalists for Ukraine